Monty is an American sitcom that aired on Fox from January 11 to February 15, 1994. The series starred Henry Winkler as Monty Richardson, a loud, obnoxious conservative TV commentator. Richardson had also written a best-selling book titled I'm Right. I'm Right. I'm Right. Shut Up. The series also starred Tom McGowan as his executive producer and David Schwimmer as his left-leaning son.  Monty hoped to capitalize on the same family dynamic that made the television show All in the Family a success in the 1970s. However, the show was canceled after six episodes.

Reception
The series was carried on NBC's development slate in 1993 before Fox began airing the show in 1994. Variety stated that while the show was clichéd, it had funny moments and that lead actor Henry Winkler did "just fine".

Cast
Henry Winkler as Monty Richardson
David Schwimmer as Greg Richardson
Kate Burton as Fran Richardson
Joyce Guy as Rita Simon
China Kantner as Geena Campbell
David Krumholtz as David Richardson
Tom McGowan as Clifford Walker

Episodes

References

External links
 

Fox Broadcasting Company original programming
English-language television shows
1990s American sitcoms
 1990s American political comedy television series
Television shows set in New York (state)
1994 American television series debuts
1994 American television series endings
Television series by ABC Studios